Allen John Furlow, Sr. (November 9, 1890 - January 29, 1954), a lawyer, was a Minnesota Congressman. Born in Rochester, Minnesota, Furlow attended public schools, graduating from Rochester High School in 1910. During the First World War, Furlow served overseas as an aviation pilot in the Army where he rose to the rank of First Lieutenant.

Furlow graduated from the law department of George Washington University, Washington, D.C., in 1920. He was admitted to the bar in 1920 and began practice in Rochester, Minnesota. He was a member of the Minnesota Senate from 1923 to 1925. He then was elected as a Republican to the 69th and 70th United States Congresses (March 4, 1925 - March 3, 1929). He was unsuccessful as a candidate for renomination in 1928.

Furlow then took employment in the legal department of the Curtiss-Wright Corporation, Washington, D.C., in 1929 and 1930. In 1933, he was appointed by the United States Attorney General as a special assistant in cases assigned under the Petroleum Code. Furlow was in the legal department of the Veterans Administration, Washington, D.C., from 1934 to 1937 before returning to Rochester, Minnesota, where he practiced law until his death in 1954. Furlow was buried in Oakwood Cemetery, Rochester Minnesota.

His son, William Loomis Furlow, MD, was a prominent urologist at the Mayo Clinic, Rochester, Minnesota.

References
Minnesota Legislators Past and Present

 https://www.postbulletin.com/history-recalls-a-gentleman-politician/article_53cea9b6-ebf1-5f4e-bde5-60a2e40423db.html

1890 births
1954 deaths
Republican Party Minnesota state senators
Republican Party members of the United States House of Representatives from Minnesota
20th-century American politicians